Austrochilus is a genus of South American cribellate araneomorph spiders in the family Austrochilidae, first described by H. Zapfe in 1955.

Species
 it contains seven species in Chile and Argentina:
Austrochilus forsteri Grismado, Lopardo & Platnick, 2003 – Chile
Austrochilus franckei Platnick, 1987 – Chile, Argentina
Austrochilus manni Gertsch & Zapfe, 1955 (type) – Chile
Austrochilus melon Platnick, 1987 – Chile
Austrochilus newtoni Platnick, 1987 – Chile
Austrochilus parwis Michalik & Wunderlich, 2017 – Chile
Austrochilus schlingeri Platnick, 1987 – Chile

References

Araneomorphae genera
Austrochilidae
Spiders of South America